International Journal of River Basin Management is a quarterly academic journal issued for the first time during the Third World Water Forum in Kyoto, March 2003. It is published in print and electronic format by Taylor & Francis, on behalf of the International Association of Hydraulic Engineering and Research, the International Association of Hydrological Sciences and the International Network of Basin Organizations.

Abstracting and indexing
 Academic Search Complete
 GeoRef
 TOC Premier
 GEOBASE (Elsevier)
 Scopus
 GeoRef

External links 
 
 Print: 
 Online: 

Environmental social science journals
Quarterly journals
Publications established in 2003
English-language journals
Taylor & Francis academic journals